In basketball, an assist is a pass to a teammate that directly leads to a score by field goal. The National Collegiate Athletic Association's (NCAA) Division I assist title is awarded to the player with the highest assists per game average in a given season. The assist title was first recognized in the 1950–51 season when statistics on assists were first compiled by the NCAA, but there are no officially recorded assist leaders between 1952–53 and 1982–83. The NCAA did not split into its current divisions format until August 1973. From 1906 to 1955, there were no classifications to the NCAA nor its predecessor, the Intercollegiate Athletic Association of the United States (IAAUS). Then, from 1956 to 1973, colleges were classified as either "NCAA University Division (Major College)" or "NCAA College Division (Small College)".

Avery Johnson of Southern University holds the all-time NCAA Division I record for single season assists per game (apg) average (13.30), which he accomplished in 1987–88. He also recorded 399 assists that season, which is the second highest single season mark behind UNLV's Mark Wade's record of 406, which occurred in 1986–87. From 1952–53 to 1982–83, the official NCAA record book has no assists per game leaders. Oklahoma freshman Trae Young was the first player to lead the NCAA in both assists and points in the 2017–18 season, while Murray State sophomore Ja Morant was the first player in NCAA history to average at least 20 points and 10 assists throughout the same season in the 2018–19 season.

Four players have earned multiple assist titles: Avery Johnson of Southern (1987, 1988), Jared Jordan of Marist (2006, 2007), Jason Brickman of LIU Brooklyn (2013, 2014), and Yuri Collins of Saint Louis. There has been one tie for the national assists leader, which happened during the 2004–05 season when Damitrius Coleman of Mercer and Will Funn of Portland State recorded identical season statistics: 28 games played, 224 total assists and an 8.00 apg average.

Only three freshmen (T. J. Ford, Lonzo Ball, and Trae Young) and two sophomores (Jason Kidd and Ja Morant) have led Division I in average assists. Two players born outside the United States have led Division I in assists — 1995–96 leader Raimonds Miglinieks of UC Irvine, born in modern-day Latvia (the Latvian SSR of the Soviet Union at the time of his birth), and 1999–2000 leader Mark Dickel of UNLV, born in New Zealand.

Key

Assists leaders

References
General

Specific

NCAA Division I men's basketball statistical leaders